Phomopsis lokoyae is a fungal plant pathogen infecting Douglas-firs.

References

External links
 USDA ARS Fungal Database

Fungal conifer pathogens and diseases
lokoyae